Valentina Aleksandrovna Zhulina (Yermakova, born 15 June 1953) is a Soviet rower. She competed under her maiden name until 1979.

References

External links
 

1953 births
Living people
Russian female rowers
Soviet female rowers
Rowers at the 1980 Summer Olympics
Olympic silver medalists for the Soviet Union
Olympic rowers of the Soviet Union
Olympic medalists in rowing
Medalists at the 1980 Summer Olympics
World Rowing Championships medalists for the Soviet Union